Thihapate of Yamethin (also known as Chauk-Hse Shin, lit. "Lord of Sixty Elephants") was governor of Yamethin in the 1330s and the 1340s during the Pinya Period. The second son of King Uzana I of Pinya considered a rebellion against his half-uncle Kyawswa I of Pinya who pushed out his father from power but ultimately decided against it.

Brief
He was born Min Htwe to Crown Prince Uzana and his chief wife Atula Maha Dhamma Dewi. His father became king in 1325 but his half-uncle Kyawswa remained a serious rival to his father. Uzana was never able to consolidate power in the following years. Although Htwe was not the eldest son—Htwe had an older brother, Sithu Min Oo—Htwe came to be relied upon by his father. He was appointed governor of Yamethin with the title of Thihapate in the late 1330s. When his father lost the power struggle with Kyawswa between 1340 and 1344, Thihapate, who then commanded a standing regiment of 60 war elephants, 800 cavalry and 1000 infantry, seriously considered a rebellion against Kyawswa. But he failed to persuade  Gov. Saw Mon Hnit of Nyaungyan to join him in rebellion. He finally agreed to submit to Kyawswa, who had sent a conciliatory gift—a rare black stallion from Onbaung.

His name does not appear in the royal chronicles afterwards. Given that he was no longer governor of Yamethin in 1351 as Swa Saw Ke became governor, Thihapate may have died by then, or may have been removed from office.

Ancestry
Prince Min Htwe was descended from the Pagan royalty from both sides. His parents were half siblings, children of King Kyawswa of Pagan.

Notes

References

Bibliography
 
 
 

Pinya dynasty